The 1880 United States presidential election in Kansas took place on November 2, 1880, as part of the 1880 United States presidential election. Voters chose five representatives, or electors to the Electoral College, who voted for president and vice president.

Kansas voted for the Republican nominee, James A. Garfield, over the Democratic nominee, Winfield Scott Hancock. Garfield won the state by a margin of 30.68%.

With 60.40% of the popular vote, Kansas would be Garfield's fifth strongest victory in terms of percentage in the popular vote after Vermont, Nebraska, Minnesota and Rhode Island. The state would also prove to be Weaver's fourth strongest state after Texas, Iowa, and Michigan.

Results

Results by county

See also
 United States presidential elections in Kansas

Notes

References

Kansas
1880
1880 Kansas elections